The Canon of Friesland or Canon of Frisian History is a list of 41 topics (11 and 30, in reference to the Dutch ordinal elfendertig) offering a chronological summary of significant events and individuals in Frisian history.

Following the example of the Canon of Groningen, the Canon of Friesland is a provincial supplement to the Canon of the Netherlands. The canon was composed by an independent commission led by Goffe Jensma and presented in print on 11 November 2008 to Jannewietske de Vries, deputy of the provincial-executive of Friesland. The website 11en30.nu was launched thereafter, produced by Tresoar and Omrop Fryslân. In the years since, the Canon of Frisian history has become a common tool for educators.

Note that the life and work of Eise Eisinga is the only topic included in both Frisian and Dutch histories.

See also
 Canon of the Netherlands
 
 
 Canon of Groningen
 
 
 
 Canon of Curaçao

References

Dutch history timelines
Historiography of the Netherlands
History of Frisia
History of Friesland